Firazorexton is an experimental orexin 2 (OX2) receptor agonist first described in a 2019 patent filed by Takeda Pharmaceutical Company.

See also
 Orexin receptor § Agonists
 List of investigational sleep drugs § Orexin receptor agonists

References

Alcohols
Experimental drugs
Fluoroarenes
Orexin receptor agonists
Pyrrolidines
Sulfonamides